Druid Heights is a neighborhood in west Baltimore.

Geography 
Druid Heights is bounded by North Avenue to the north, Madison Avenue and McCulloh Street to the east, Laurens Street and Bloom Street to the south, and Pennsylvania Avenue to the west. Adjacent neighborhoods are Penn-North (northwest), Reservoir Hill (northeast), Madison Park (east), Upton (south), and Sandtown-Winchester (west).

References 

Neighborhoods in Baltimore
West Baltimore